Luis Niño (born 3 August 1946) is a Mexican diver. He competed at the 1964 Summer Olympics and the 1968 Summer Olympics.

References

External links
 

1946 births
Living people
Mexican male divers
Olympic divers of Mexico
Divers at the 1964 Summer Olympics
Divers at the 1968 Summer Olympics
Divers from Mexico City
Divers at the 1967 Pan American Games
Pan American Games silver medalists for Mexico
Pan American Games medalists in diving
Medalists at the 1967 Pan American Games
21st-century Mexican people
20th-century Mexican people